Thomas Jervis Ryan (1834–1901) was a New Zealand policeman. He was born in  Ireland in about 1834.

In 1861 he joined Otago's police force. In 1862 he moved to Palmerston. He oversaw gold rushes at places such as Lake End, Tokomairiro, and the Mt. Ida district. In 1865, because of his lackadaisical work ethic and proclivity to alcohol, he was transferred from Canterbury province to Mackenzie County. Later that year he was stationed in Waitangi (Glenavy), but was put back in Mackenzie in 1866. In 1869, after being transferred more around New Zealand, he married Ellen Johnston in Dunedin. The next year he resigned from the police force. In 1872, and again in 1890, Ryan was arrested for assault. Later, in 1901, he was sent to jail for theft and was sent to the Sunnyside Lunatic Asylum, where he died on October 14.

References

1834 births
1901 deaths
New Zealand police officers
Irish emigrants to New Zealand (before 1923)
People from Otago